The Diocese of Kibondo is a diocese in the Anglican Church of Tanzania: its bishop is the Right Reverend  Dr Sospeter Temeo Ndenza, DD.

Notes

External links
Official website
Anglican Communion website listing

Anglican Church of Tanzania dioceses
Anglican bishops of Kibondo
Anglican realignment dioceses